KSDN may refer to:

KSDN (AM), a radio station (930 AM) licensed to Aberdeen, South Dakota, United States
KSDN-FM, a radio station (94.1 FM) licensed to Aberdeen, South Dakota, United States